Goonj Uthi Shehnai is a 1959 Hindi film directed by Vijay Bhatt, with Rajendra Kumar, Ameeta, Anita Guha and I. S. Johar as leads. The film has music by Vasant Desai and lyrics by Bharat Vyas, and the duo created numerous hits such as "Jivan Men Piya Tera Sath Rahe" sung by Lata Mangeshkar and Mohd. Rafi, and Lata's "Tere Sur Aur Mere Geet" and "Dil Ka Khilona Hai Toot Gaya".

The film narrates the story of a Shehnai player, and features a shehnai recitals by maestro Ustad Bismillah Khan throughout the film. There is also Jugalbandi between him and Sitar player, Abdul Halim Jaffar Khan.

The film was the fifth highest grosser of the year and was declared a "Hit" at Box Office India and became the first big hit of actor Rajendra Kumar, who was soon giving dates four years from the day of signing.

Cast
 Rajendra Kumar - Kishan
 Ameeta - Gopi
 Anita Guha - Ramkali (Rami)
 I. S. Johar - Kanhaiya
 Ulhas	as Raghunath Maharaj
 Manmohan Krishna - Gangaram
 Leela Mishra	- Jamuna
 Pratap Kumar - Shekhar
 Prem Dhawan - Banjara
 Ram Moorti - Uncle
 Pramila - choti kaki

Awards and nominations
 1960: Filmfare Award
 Filmfare Best Supporting Actress Award: Anita Guha: ''Nominated"to

Soundtrack 
The soundtrack includes the following tracks, composed by Vasant Desai, and with lyrics by Bharat Vyas, also featuring shehnai pieces by noted classical instrumentalist Ustad Bismillah Khan, with vocal renderings by Amir Khan, a Hindustani classical music vocalist.

Notes

References

External links 
 

1959 films
1959 drama films
1950s Hindi-language films
Indian drama films
Films directed by Vijay Bhatt
Films scored by Vasant Desai
Hindi-language drama films